Boneh-ye Kazem (also Romanized as Boneh-ye Kāz̧em; also known as Band-e Sho‘eybīyeh) is a village in Shoaybiyeh-ye Gharbi Rural District, Shadravan District, Shushtar County, Khuzestan Province, Iran. At the 2006 census, its population was 144, in 21 families.

References 

Populated places in Shushtar County